Princess cake is a traditional Swedish layer cake or torte consisting of alternating layers of airy sponge cake,  pastry cream, raspberry jam and a thick-domed layer of whipped cream.  The cake is covered by a layer of marzipan, giving it a smooth rounded top.  The marzipan overlay is usually green, sprinkled with powdered sugar, and often decorated with a pink marzipan rose.

The original recipe first appeared in the 1948 Prinsessornas kokbok cookbook, which was published by Jenny Åkerström (1867-1957),   teacher of the three daughters of Prince Carl, Duke of Västergötland.  While the original recipe did not contain any fruit, modern versions may include layers of jam or fresh fruit, usually raspberries.  Variants with other colours of marzipan are occasionally called prinstårta (prince cake) for yellow marzipan and operatårta (opera cake) for red or pink marzipan.

The cake was originally called grön tårta (green cake), but was given the name prinsesstårta or "princess cake" because the princesses were said to have been especially fond of the cake. The princesses were Princess Margaretha (1899–1977; later Princess of Denmark), Princess Märtha (1901–1954; later Crown Princess of Norway), and Princess Astrid (1905–1935; later Queen of the Belgians).

See also
 Frog cake, a broadly similar Australian dessert
List of cakes

References

Marzipan
Sponge cakes
Layer cakes
Foods with jam
Swedish desserts